Rasmus Rikard Svensson is a Swedish former professional footballer who played as a defender. He represented the Sweden U21 team at the 1992 UEFA European Under-21 Championship where Sweden finished second.

References

1971 births
Living people
Association football defenders
Swedish footballers
Sweden youth international footballers
Sweden under-21 international footballers
Allsvenskan players
Malmö FF players
Halmstads BK players
Falkenbergs FF players